Kusiji (also Romanized as Kūsījī) is a village in Birk Rural District, in the Central District of Mehrestan County, Sistan and Baluchestan Province, Iran. At the 2006 census, its population was 74, in 15 families.

References 

Populated places in Mehrestan County